Gabriel Abratanski (born February 20, 1975) is an Uruguayan former basketball player.

References

1975 births
Living people
Basketball players at the 1999 Pan American Games
Pan American Games competitors for Uruguay
Uruguayan men's basketball players